Prairie Creek Township, Nebraska may refer to the following places:

 Prairie Creek Township, Merrick County, Nebraska
 Prairie Creek Township, Hall County, Nebraska
 Prairie Creek Township, Nance County, Nebraska

See also
Prairie Creek Township (disambiguation)

Nebraska township disambiguation pages